Austan Dean Goolsbee (born August 18, 1969) is an American economist and writer. He is the President of the Federal Reserve Bank of Chicago. Goolsbee formerly served as the Robert P. Gwinn Professor of Economics at the University of Chicago's Booth School of Business. He was the Chairman of the Council of Economic Advisers from 2010-2011 and a member of President Barack Obama's cabinet. He served as a member of the Chicago Board of Education from 2018-2019.

Goolsbee was a member of the Council of Economic Advisers before becoming chair. He was also the Chief economist and chief-of-staff to Paul Volcker at the President's Economic Recovery Advisory Board - the board was formed in the wake of the 2007–2008 financial crisis.

Early life and education 
Goolsbee was born in Waco, Texas, the son of Linda Catherine (née Dean) and the late Arthur Leon Goolsbee, a former executive of Utility Trailer Manufacturing Company. He was raised primarily in Whittier, California.

He graduated from Milton Academy and received both his B.A. summa cum laude and M.A. in economics from Yale University in 1991. He went on to receive his Ph.D. in economics at the Massachusetts Institute of Technology in 1995.

He was named an Alfred P. Sloan Fellow (2000–02) and Fulbright Scholar (2006–07).

Academia 
Goolsbee has been a Research Fellow at the American Bar Foundation, Research Associate at the National Bureau of Economic Research in Cambridge, Massachusetts, and a member of the Panel of Economic Advisors to the Congressional Budget Office. He was previously named a Senior Economist to the Progressive Policy Institute (PPI) and a Distinguished Senior Fellow at the Center for American Progress.

Goolsbee's academic research focuses on the Internet, the new economy, government policy, and taxes. He has taught MBA classes on microeconomics, platform competition, economics and policy in the telecom, media and technology industries and economic policy (jointly with Raghuram Rajan) and Ph.D. classes in Public Economics.

Goolsbee was a journalist while serving as an academic. Goolsbee is the former host of the television show History's Business on the History Channel. In April 2006, Goolsbee began writing for the Economic Scene column in The New York Times. This column was later moved to Sundays and renamed the Economic View. He continues to serve as a columnist for it today. Prior to this, he wrote the "Dismal Science" column for Slate.com, for which he won the 2006 Peter Lisagor Award for Exemplary Journalism. He has published papers in various peer-reviewed journals and books.

Public service

Campaign Advising 
He advised President Obama during his 2004 U.S. Senate race and was senior economic policy adviser during the 2008 Obama presidential campaign.

In 2019, he endorsed Pete Buttigieg during the Democratic Party presidential primary.

In the 2020 general election, he co-chaired the Economic Advisory Council for the Joe Biden Campaign.

Service in Obama administration 

Goolsbee was nominated by Obama to serve on the Council of Economic Advisers on his first day in office. Goolsbee was confirmed by the Senate on March 10, 2009.  He concurrently served as chief economist and chief of staff at the Economic Recovery Advisory Board. He was designated chair of the Council on September 10, 2010 succeeding Christina Romer.

In these capacities, Goolsbee served as a media surrogate for the Obama Administration and his skill on television was noted in the media. He also starred in the White House Whiteboards which explained administration policy in an accessible way. A New York Times article about them reported "praise for Mr. Goolsbee’s performance from journalists at Politico, The Wall Street Journal, The Economist and other outlets" 

Outside of the standard political news shows Goolsbee was a frequent guest on comedy shows, as well. He was interviewed by Jon Stewart for The Daily Show on August 11, 2009; February 1, 2010; October 25, 2010; February 24, 2011; August 3, 2011; and September 6, 2012.

He also appeared in Daily Show segments on November 11, 2009, where he was interviewed by Josh Gad about whether the Cash for Clunkers program had ruined demolition derby and on March 17, 2009 where he said that executives at American International Group (AIG) deserved the "Nobel prize for evil" ) for their role in the 2008 financial crisis. Jon Stewart described him as "Eliot Ness meets Milton Friedman".

In 2009, he was voted the Funniest Celebrity in Washington. One practical joke was giving a dead fish to the departing White House chief of staff Rahm Emanuel, who has been known to give dead fish to political opponents.

On June 15, 2009, he appeared as a guest on The Colbert Report. He made a second appearance on The Colbert Report on October 13, 2010, where he defended Obama's tax cut policies which would allow tax breaks to expire for Americans earning more than $250,000 per year. Goolsbee's main arguments were that 98% of Americans would still receive a tax break under the Obama proposal and that the country would have to borrow money to fund tax breaks for the wealthiest Americans if all tax breaks were extended. In November 2010, however, the House of Representatives swung to a Republican majority who threatened that they would not extend the expiring tax cuts on that 98% without extending the cuts for the wealthiest 2% as well, and in December Obama signed a compromise deal to extend the cuts for all.

In January 2011, Goolsbee expressed the administration's confidence that the U.S. debt limit would be raised, noting that rhetoric from some members of Congress, who suggested the routine increase should be opposed, "[appear] to reflect a deep misunderstanding of the consequences of default".

On June 6, 2011, Goolsbee announced that he would return to the University of Chicago. He was expected to play an informal role from Chicago in Obama's 2012 campaign.

Recognition 
Over the years he has been named one of the 100 Global Leaders for Tomorrow by the World Economic Forum in Switzerland, one of the six "Gurus of the Future" by the Financial Times, one of the 40 Under 40 by Crain's Chicago Business, and one of the 30 Under 30 by the Chicago Sun-Times. He topped The New Yorker's list of the Ten Most Intriguing Political Personalities of 2010. Salon.com named him to its list of the 15 Sexiest Men of 2010.  To this he remarked on NPR's quiz show Wait Wait...Don't Tell Me, "I didn't even know Salon was printed in Braille."  Additionally, the National Speech and Debate Association (formerly National Forensic League) recognized Goolsbee, the former national champion in extemporaneous speaking, as the 2011 Communicator of the Year. He was a successful debater in college. He and his partner David Gray were the National Team of the Year in 1991, defeating future senator Ted Cruz and his partner for the honor.

Press profiles of him include those done by The New York Times, NPR, George Will, the Financial Times, Reuters TV, the Chicago Tribune, Crain's Chicago Business, and Politico.

Personal life 
Goolsbee married Robin Winters on November 1, 1997. She was a management consultant with McKinsey & Company at the time and earlier the director of business development at MTV International. They have a daughter, Aden, and two sons, Addison and Emmett.

References

External links 

Staff Director and Chief Economist Austan Goolsbee at the President's Economic Recovery Advisory Board
Austan Goolsbee profile at the University of Chicago Experts panel

Austan Goolsbee, "Democratizing Capitalism", July 22, 2006, and "Why Deficits Still Matter", April 30, 2007 at the Democratic Leadership Council

|-

1969 births
21st-century American economists
21st-century American journalists
21st-century American male writers
21st-century American non-fiction writers
American economics writers
American male non-fiction writers
Chairs of the United States Council of Economic Advisers
Economists from California
Economists from Texas
Federal Reserve Bank of Chicago presidents
Fulbright alumni
Illinois Democrats
Living people
Milton Academy alumni
MIT School of Humanities, Arts, and Social Sciences alumni
National Bureau of Economic Research
Obama administration cabinet members
Obama administration personnel
People from Waco, Texas
Sloan Research Fellows
The New York Times columnists
University of Chicago faculty
Writers from Chicago
Writers from Whittier, California
Yale University alumni